The Yunnan Army was an army raised by the Qing dynasty to fight in the Sino-French War during the Tonkin Campaign. Liu Yongfu was a commander of the Yunnan army.

References

Military history of Yunnan
Sino-French War
Disbanded armies
Military units and formations of the Qing dynasty